Bruce Korte (born July 22, 1967 in Muenster, Saskatchewan) is a Canadian curler from Saskatoon. He is a three-time SaskTel Tankard provincial champion.

As a junior, Korte's top accomplishment was losing the 1984 men's provincial junior final.

Korte has won three provincial championships, in 2000, 2004 and 2010. At the 2000 Labatt Brier, Korte's Saskatchewan rink finished 5-6. In 2004, Korte downed Brad Heidt in the Saskatchewan final. At the 2004 Nokia Brier, his rink finished 5-6 once again. At the 2010 Tim Hortons Brier, he played third for his long-time third Darrell McKee and the team finished the event with a 4-7 record.

In 2002, Korte skipped his rink to his first and only Grand Slam of Curling title, winning the Masters of Curling over Jeff Stoughton. Korte has been a skip for almost his entire career except for the period between 2009 and 2011 when he threw third stones for McKee. McKee left the team in 2011.

Korte skipped team Saskatchewan at the 2016 Canadian Mixed Curling Championship, making it all the way to the final before losing to Alberta. He skipped Saskatchewan again at the 2018 Canadian Mixed Curling Championship, but missed qualifying for the championship pool.

Korte also skipped Saskatchewan at the 2019 Canadian Senior Curling Championships, winning the event over defending champions Bryan Cochrane of Ontario.

Personal life
Korte is married to Marje and has three daughters. He currently works as CurlSask's event manager.

Grand Slam record

External links

References

1967 births
Living people
Curlers from Saskatoon
Canadian male curlers